is a former Japanese football player.

Playing career
Oshiba was born in Yamanashi Prefecture on May 10, 1973. After graduating from Meiji University, he joined Japan Football League club Ventforet Kofu based in his local in 1996. He played many matches as forward from first season and the club was promoted to new league J2 League from 1999. In 2000, he moved to J1 League club JEF United Ichihara. He played many matches as offensive midfielder and forward. However his opportunity to play decreased in 2003. In 2004, he moved to J2 club Vegalta Sendai. He played many matches as forward until 2005. However his opportunity to play decreased in 2006 and he retired end of 2006 season.

Club statistics

References

External links

1973 births
Living people
Meiji University alumni
Association football people from Yamanashi Prefecture
Japanese footballers
J1 League players
J2 League players
Japan Football League (1992–1998) players
Ventforet Kofu players
JEF United Chiba players
Vegalta Sendai players
Association football forwards